The Miss Rhode Island USA competition is the beauty pageant that selects the representative for the state Rhode Island in the Miss USA pageant. It is currently directed by D&D Productions.

Rhode Island made its first placement at Miss USA in 1961 and has been one of the most consistent states since 2000, with four semi-finalist placements and one first runner-up placement. On June 3, 2012, Olivia Culpo won the first Miss USA title from the state of Rhode Island. On December 19, 2012, Culpo became the first Rhode Islander to win the title of Miss Universe. She also became the first Quadruple Crown winner in the history of Miss Rhode Island Teen USA and Miss Rhode Island USA.

Elaine Collado of Providence was crowned Miss Rhode Island USA 2022 on May 29, 2022, at Veterans Memorial Auditorium in Providence. She represented Rhode Island for the title of Miss USA 2022.

Gallery of titleholders

Results summary

Placements
Miss USA: Olivia Culpo (2012) 
1st runners-up: Danielle Lacourse (2007)
2nd runners-up: Gayle White (1973), Anea Garcia (2015)
Top 10/11/12:  Jennifer Aubin (1995), Claudia Jordan (1997), Yanaiza Alvarez (2001), Janet Sutton (2002), Leeann Tingley (2006)
Top 15: Joan Zeller (1961), Amy Diaz (2008)

Rhode Island holds a record of 11 placements at Miss USA.

Awards
Miss Congeniality: Christina Palavra (2014)

Winners 
Color key

 

1 Age at the time of the Miss Rhode Island USA pageant

References

External links
 
 "This beauty queen wears Army boots"

Rhode Island
Rhode Island culture
1952 establishments in Rhode Island
Women in Rhode Island
Recurring events established in 1952
Annual events in Rhode Island